Kawki  is a village in the administrative district of Gmina Pasłęk, within Elbląg County, Warmian-Masurian Voivodeship, in northern Poland.

Before the end of the second world war the area was part of Germany (East Prussia).

The village has a population of 40.

References

Kawki